Altıntaş is a village in the District of Kalecik, Ankara Province, Turkey.

Culture 
Traditions of the Turkmen Oghuz Turks are partly alive in this village. People of this village have a patriarchal family experience.

References

Villages in Kalecik District